There are about 380 known moth species of the Republic of the Congo. The moths (mostly nocturnal) and butterflies (mostly diurnal) together make up the taxonomic order Lepidoptera.

This is a list of moth species which have been recorded in the Republic of the Congo.

Adelidae
Ceromitia systelitis Meyrick, 1921
Nemophora parvella (Walker, 1863)

Alucitidae
Alucita balioxantha (Meyrick, 1921)
Alucita imbrifera (Meyrick, 1929)
Alucita sertifera (Meyrick, 1921)

Anomoeotidae
Anomoeotes nox Aurivillius, 1907
Thermochrous fumicincta Hampson, 1910

Arctiidae
Afrasura obliterata (Walker, 1864)
Aglossosia deceptans Hampson, 1914
Amata creobota (Holland, 1893)
Amata francisca (Butler, 1876)
Amata goodii (Holland, 1893)
Amata interniplaga (Mabille, 1890)
Amata leimacis (Holland, 1893)
Amata marina (Butler, 1876)
Amerila vitrea Plötz, 1880
Anaphosia cyanogramma Hampson, 1903
Anapisa crenophylax (Holland, 1893)
Anapisa melaleuca (Holland, 1898)
Anapisa monotica (Holland, 1893)
Apisa canescens Walker, 1855
Archithosia costimacula (Mabille, 1878)
Balacra daphaena (Hampson, 1898)
Balacra flavimacula Walker, 1856
Balacra haemalea Holland, 1893
Balacra pulchra Aurivillius, 1892
Balacra rubricincta Holland, 1893
Boadicea pelecoides Tams, 1930
Caripodia chrysargyria Hampson, 1900
Ceryx albimacula (Walker, 1854)
Ceryx elasson (Holland, 1893)
Creatonotos leucanioides Holland, 1893
Cyana rubristriga (Holland, 1893)
Euchromia guineensis (Fabricius, 1775)
Euchromia lethe (Fabricius, 1775)
Hippurarctia taymansi (Rothschild, 1910)
Mecistorhabdia haematoessa (Holland, 1893)
Meganaclia sippia (Plötz, 1880)
Metarctia burra (Schaus & Clements, 1893)
Metarctia haematica Holland, 1893
Metarctia inconspicua Holland, 1892
Metarctia paulis Kiriakoff, 1961
Metarctia rufescens Walker, 1855
Myopsyche elachista (Holland, 1893)
Myopsyche miserabilis (Holland, 1893)
Myopsyche ochsenheimeri (Boisduval, 1829)
Myopsyche puncticincta (Holland, 1893)
Nanna eningae (Plötz, 1880)
Neophemula vitrina (Oberthür, 1909)
Nyctemera apicalis (Walker, 1854)
Nyctemera xanthura (Plötz, 1880)
Ovenna vicaria (Walker, 1854)
Pusiola melemona (Kiriakoff, 1963)
Pusiola theresia (Kiriakoff, 1963)
Rhipidarctia invaria (Walker, 1856)
Trichaeta fulvescens (Walker, 1854)
Trichaeta pterophorina (Mabille, 1892)

Autostichidae
Autosticha nothriforme (Walsingham, 1897)

Carposinidae
Meridarchis luteus (Walsingham, 1897)

Choreutidae
Anthophila equatoris (Walsingham, 1897)
Anthophila flavimaculata (Walsingham, 1891)
Brenthia octogemmifera Walsingham, 1897

Crambidae
Cotachena smaragdina (Butler, 1875)
Palpita elealis (Walker, 1859)

Elachistidae
Ethmia rhomboidella Walsingham, 1897
Microcolona pantomima Meyrick, 1917

Eriocottidae
Compsoctena media Walsingham, 1897
Compsoctena secundella (Walsingham, 1897)

Eupterotidae
Jana eurymas Herrich-Schäffer, 1854
Jana gracilis Walker, 1855
Jana preciosa Aurivillius, 1893
Jana strigina Westwood, 1849
Phiala albida Plötz, 1880
Phiala subiridescens (Holland, 1893)
Stenoglene bipunctatus (Aurivillius, 1909)

Gelechiidae
Bactropaltis lithosema Meyrick, 1939
Dichomeris eurynotus (Walsingham, 1897)
Dichomeris marmoratus (Walsingham, 1891)
Ptilothyris crossoceros Meyrick, 1934
Ptilothyris purpurea Walsingham, 1897
Theatrocopia elegans Walsingham, 1897
Theatrocopia roseoviridis Walsingham, 1897

Geometridae
Aletis erici Kirby, 1896
Anacleora diffusa (Walker, 1869)
Aphilopota mailaria (Swinhoe, 1904)
Aphilopota strigosissima (Bastelberger, 1909)
Biston abruptaria (Walker, 1869)
Braueriana fiorino Bryk, 1913
Chiasmia majestica (Warren, 1901)
Chiasmia streniata (Guenée, 1858)
Chrysocraspeda abdominalis (Herbulot, 1984)
Chrysocraspeda rubripennis (Warren, 1898)
Colocleora binoti Herbulot, 1983
Colocleora ducleri Herbulot, 1983
Colocleora linearis Herbulot, 1985
Colocleora sanghana Herbulot, 1985
Colocleora smithi (Warren, 1904)
Conolophia persimilis (Warren, 1905)
Dorsifulcrum cephalotes (Walker, 1869)
Epigynopteryx prophylacis Herbulot, 1984
Euproutia aggravaria (Guenée, 1858)
Hypochrosis banakaria (Plötz, 1880)
Hypomecis dedecora (Herbulot, 1985)
Idaea inquisita (Prout, 1932)
Melinoessa sodaliata (Walker, 1862)
Melinoessa stramineata (Walker, 1869)
Mesomima tenuifascia (Holland, 1893)
Miantochora picturata Herbulot, 1985
Mimaletis postica (Walker, 1869)
Oxyfidonia umbrina Herbulot, 1985
Piercia myopteryx Prout, 1935
Pitthea catadela D. S. Fletcher, 1963
Pitthea cunaxa Druce, 1887
Pitthea famula Drury, 1773
Pitthea perspicua (Linnaeus, 1758)
Prasinocyma congrua (Walker, 1869)
Psilocladia loxostigma Prout, 1915
Racotis squalida (Butler, 1878)
Scopula macrocelis (Prout, 1915)
Semiothisa testaceata (Walker, 1863)
Somatina chalyboeata (Walker, 1869)
Terina circumdata Walker, 1865
Terina crocea Hampson, 1910
Terina latifascia Walker, 1854
Terina niphanda Druce, 1887
Xenochroma silvatica Herbulot, 1984
Xylopteryx triphaenata Herbulot, 1984
Zamarada modesta Herbulot, 1985
Zeuctoboarmia ochracea Herbulot, 1985

Glyphipterigidae
Glyphipterix gemmatella (Walker, 1864)

Gracillariidae
Stomphastis thraustica (Meyrick, 1908)

Himantopteridae
Pedoptila thaletes Druce, 1907
Semioptila semiflava Talbot, 1928
Semioptila seminigra Talbot, 1928

Hyblaeidae
Hyblaea occidentalium Holland, 1894

Immidae
Moca radiata (Walsingham, 1897)

Lacturidae
Gymnogramma atmocycla Meyrick, 1918
Gymnogramma hollandi (Walsingham, 1897)

Lasiocampidae
Cheligium choerocampoides (Holland, 1893)
Cheligium nigrescens (Aurivillius, 1909)
Cheligium pinheyi Zolotuhin & Gurkovich, 2009
Euwallengrenia reducta (Walker, 1855)
Gelo jordani (Tams, 1936)
Grellada imitans (Aurivillius, 1893)
Grellada marshalli (Aurivillius, 1902)
Lechriolepis tessmanni Strand, 1912
Leipoxais marginepunctata Holland, 1893
Leipoxais rufobrunnea Strand, 1912
Mimopacha gerstaeckerii (Dewitz, 1881)
Mimopacha knoblauchii (Dewitz, 1881)
Muzunguja rectilineata (Aurivillius, 1900)
Nepehria olivia Gurkovich & Zolotuhin, 2010
Odontocheilopteryx conzolia Gurkovich & Zolotuhin, 2009
Odontocheilopteryx phoneus Hering, 1928
Opisthoheza heza Zolotuhin & Prozorov, 2010
Pachymeta contraria (Walker, 1855)
Pachyna subfascia (Walker, 1855)
Pachytrina gliharta Zolotuhin & Gurkovich, 2009
Pachytrina honrathii (Dewitz, 1881)
Pachytrina philargyria (Hering, 1928)
Pachytrina rubra (Tams, 1929)
Pachytrina trihora Zolotuhin & Gurkovich, 2009
Pallastica lateritia (Hering, 1928)
Pallastica meloui (Riel, 1909)
Pallastica sericeofasciata (Aurivillius, 1921)
Pehria umbrina (Aurivillius, 1909)
Schausinna clementsi (Schaus, 1897)
Sonitha libera (Aurivillius, 1914)
Stenophatna hollandi (Tams, 1929)
Stenophatna kahli (Tams, 1929)
Theophasida obusta (Tams, 1929)
Theophasida valkyria Zolotuhin & Prozorov, 2010

Lecithoceridae
Odites cuculans Meyrick, 1918

Limacodidae
Parasa chapmani Kirby, 1892
Zinara nervosa Walker, 1869

Lymantriidae
Euproctis pygmaea (Walker, 1855)
Knappetra fasciata (Walker, 1855)
Naroma signifera Walker, 1856
Olapa tavetensis (Holland, 1892)
Otroeda manifesta (Swinhoe, 1903)

Noctuidae
Acantholipes circumdata (Walker, 1858)
Achaea jamesoni L. B. Prout, 1919
Acontia citrelinea Bethune-Baker, 1911
Aegocera fervida (Walker, 1854)
Aegocera obliqua Mabille, 1893
Aegocera rectilinea Boisduval, 1836
Aegocera tigrina (Druce, 1882)
Agrotis catenifera Walker, 1869
Agrotis hemileuca Walker, 1869
Aletia consanguis (Guenée, 1852)
Aletopus ruspina (Aurivillius, 1909)
Argyrolopha punctilinea Prout, 1921
Asota chionea (Mabille, 1878)
Athetis partita (Walker, 1857)
Callopistria maillardi (Guenée, 1862)
Colpocheilopteryx operatrix (Wallengren, 1860)
Egnasia scoliogramma Prout, 1921
Epischausia dispar (Rothschild, 1896)
Ericeia congregata (Walker, 1858)
Ericeia lituraria (Saalmüller, 1880)
Feliniopsis kuehnei Hacker & Fibiger, 2007
Feliniopsis parvula Hacker & Fibiger, 2007
Feliniopsis sinaevi Hacker & Mey, 2010
Halochroa aequatoria (Mabille, 1879)
Helicoverpa assulta (Guenée, 1852)
Heraclia aemulatrix (Westwood, 1881)
Heraclia longipennis (Walker, 1854)
Heraclia pardalina (Walker, 1869)
Hespagarista caudata (Dewitz, 1879)
Hypena obacerralis Walker, [1859]
Janseodes melanospila (Guenée, 1852)
Mentaxya ignicollis (Walker, 1857)
Metagarista maenas (Herrich-Schäffer, 1853)
Omphaloceps triangularis (Mabille, 1893)
Ophiusa david (Holland, 1894)
Oraesia provocans Walker, [1858]
Schausia gladiatoria (Holland, 1893)
Schausia leona (Schaus, 1893)
Sciatta inconcisa Walker, 1869
Trigonodes exportata Guenée, 1852
Tuerta chrysochlora Walker, 1869

Nolidae
Eligma allaudi Pinhey, 1968

Notodontidae
Antheua simplex Walker, 1855
Antheua trifasciata (Hampson, 1909)
Arciera postalba Kiriakoff, 1960
Arciera roseiventris Kiriakoff, 1960
Arciera rufescens (Kiriakoff, 1962)
Boscawenia bryki (Schultze, 1934)
Boscawenia caradrinoides (Schultze, 1934)
Boscawenia incerta (Schultze, 1934)
Boscawenia jaspidea (Schultze, 1934)
Catarctia divisa (Walker, 1855)
Desmeocraera chloeropsis (Holland, 1893)
Desmeocraera congoana Aurivillius, 1900
Desmeocraera geminata Gaede, 1928
Desmeocraera sagittata Gaede, 1928
Epidonta insigniata (Gaede, 1932)
Haplozana nigrolineata Aurivillius, 1901
Scaeopteryx curvatula (Rothschild, 1917)
Scalmicauda adusta Kiriakoff, 1963
Scalmicauda rectilinea (Gaede, 1928)
Scrancia stictica Hampson, 1910

Oecophoridae
Orygocera carnicolor Walsingham, 1897
Pseudoprotasis canariella Walsingham, 1897

Psychidae
Melasina imperfecta Meyrick, 1922
Melasina polycapnias Meyrick, 1922
Melasina scrutaria Meyrick, 1922
Mesopolia inconspicua Walsingham, 1897
Narycia centropa Meyrick, 1922

Pterophoridae
Crocydoscelus ferrugineum Walsingham, 1897
Lantanophaga pusillidactylus (Walker, 1864)
Megalorhipida leucodactylus (Fabricius, 1794)
Pterophorus candidalis (Walker, 1864)
Pterophorus spissa (Bigot, 1969)
Stenoptilodes taprobanes (Felder & Rogenhofer, 1875)

Saturniidae
Bunaeopsis licharbas (Maassen & Weymer, 1885)
Decachorda congolana Bouvier, 1930
Decachorda inspersa (Hampson, 1910)
Epiphora congolana (Bouvier, 1929)
Epiphora vacuna (Westwood, 1849)
Gonimbrasia rectilineata (Sonthonnax, 1899)
Gonimbrasia tyrrhea (Cramer, 1775)
Goodia dimonica Darge, 2008
Goodia hierax Jordan, 1922
Goodia lunata Holland, 1893
Goodia unguiculata Bouvier, 1936
Lobobunaea phaedusa (Drury, 1782)
Lobobunaea rosea (Sonthonnax, 1899)
Micragone agathylla (Westwood, 1849)
Micragone caliginosa Darge, 2010
Micragone ducorpsi (De Fleury, 1925)
Micragone elisabethae Bouvier, 1930
Micragone joiceyi Bouvier, 1930
Micragone lichenodes (Holland, 1893)
Micragone loutemboensis Darge, 2010
Micragone morini Rougeot, 1977
Micragone neonubifera Rougeot, 1979
Nudaurelia alopia Westwood, 1849
Nudaurelia bouvieri (Le Moult, 1933)
Nudaurelia emini (Butler, 1888)
Orthogonioptilum andreasum Rougeot, 1967
Orthogonioptilum fontainei Rougeot, 1962
Orthogonioptilum prox Karsch, 1892
Pseudantheraea discrepans (Butler, 1878)
Pseudaphelia kaeremii Bouvier, 1927
Pseudaphelia simplex Rebel, 1906
Pseudimbrasia deyrollei (J. Thomson, 1858)
Pseudobunaea parathyrrena (Bouvier, 1927)

Sesiidae
Chamanthedon brillians (Beutenmüller, 1899)
Chamanthedon tropica (Beutenmüller, 1899)
Conopia auronitens (Le Cerf, 1913)
Conopia nuba (Beutenmüller, 1899)
Conopia olenda (Beutenmüller, 1899)
Melittia auriplumia Hampson, 1910
Melittia occidentalis Le Cerf, 1917
Similipepsis violacea Le Cerf, 1911
Synanthedon albiventris (Beutenmüller, 1899)
Tipulamima festiva (Beutenmüller, 1899)
Tipulamima malimba (Beutenmüller, 1899)

Sphingidae
Grillotius bergeri (Darge, 1973)
Hippotion aporodes Rothschild & Jordan, 1912
Hippotion irregularis (Walker, 1856)
Leucophlebia afra Karsch, 1891
Leucostrophus commasiae (Walker, 1856)
Neopolyptychus consimilis (Rothschild & Jordan, 1903)
Neopolyptychus prionites (Rothschild & Jordan, 1916)
Nephele discifera Karsch, 1891
Nephele maculosa Rothschild & Jordan, 1903
Nephele oenopion (Hübner, [1824])
Nephele rectangulata Rothschild, 1895
Nephele vau (Walker, 1856)
Phylloxiphia bicolor (Rothschild, 1894)
Phylloxiphia oberthueri (Rothschild & Jordan, 1903)
Platysphinx constrigilis (Walker, 1869)
Platysphinx stigmatica (Mabille, 1878)
Polyptychus andosa Walker, 1856
Polyptychus carteri (Butler, 1882)
Polyptychus enodia (Holland, 1889)
Polyptychus murinus Rothschild, 1904
Polyptychus thihongae Bernardi, 1970
Pseudoclanis admatha Pierre, 1985
Pseudoclanis postica (Walker, 1856)
Pseudoclanis rhadamistus (Fabricius, 1781)
Rhadinopasa hornimani (Druce, 1880)
Temnora albilinea Rothschild, 1904
Temnora atrofasciata Holland, 1889
Temnora crenulata (Holland, 1893)
Temnora curtula Rothschild & Jordan, 1908
Temnora eranga (Holland, 1889)
Temnora funebris (Holland, 1893)
Temnora griseata Rothschild & Jordan, 1903
Temnora hollandi Clark, 1920
Temnora livida (Holland, 1889)
Temnora ntombi Darge, 1975
Temnora plagiata Walker, 1856
Temnora rattrayi Rothschild, 1904
Temnora sardanus (Walker, 1856)
Temnora scitula (Holland, 1889)
Temnora spiritus (Holland, 1893)
Temnora stevensi Rothschild & Jordan, 1903
Theretra orpheus (Herrich-Schäffer, 1854)

Thyrididae
Arniocera viridifasciata (Aurivillius, 1900)
Marmax semiaurata (Walker, 1854)

Tineidae
Ceratophaga vastellus (Zeller, 1852)
Cimitra fetialis (Meyrick, 1917)
Criticonoma episcardina (Gozmány, 1965)
Dasyses rugosella (Stainton, 1859)
Hyperbola zicsii Gozmány, 1965
Machaeropteris baloghi Gozmány, 1965
Monopis megalodelta Meyrick, 1908
Monopis monachella (Hübner, 1796)
Morophaga soror Gozmány, 1965
Oxymachaeris euryzancla Meyrick, 1918
Perissomastix pyroxantha (Meyrick, 1914)
Pitharcha latriodes (Meyrick, 1917)
Tiquadra lichenea Walsingham, 1897

Tortricidae
Accra viridis (Walsingham, 1891)
Ancylis argenticiliana Walsingham, 1897
Archips symmetra (Meyrick, 1918)
Bactra bactrana (Kennel, 1901)
Cydia hemisphaerana (Walsingham, 1897)
Eccopsis praecedens Walsingham, 1897
Enarmoniodes praetextana (Walsingham, 1897)
Idiothauma africanum Walsingham, 1897
Labidosa ochrostoma (Meyrick, 1918)
Metendothenia balanacma (Meyrick, 1914)
Mictocommosis argus (Walsingham, 1897)
Sanguinograptis albardana (Snellen, 1872)

Zygaenidae
Astyloneura chlorotica (Hampson, 1920)
Saliunca mimetica Jordan, 1907
Saliunca nkolentangensis Strand, 1913
Saliunca rubriventris Holland, 1920

References

External links 
 

Moths
Moths
Congo, Republic
Congo, Republic